Gomselmash (trade name — Open Joint Stock Company "Gomselmash") is a Belarusian manufacturer of agricultural machinery based in Gomel.

History

The construction of an agricultural machinery plant in Gomel began in 1928. October 15, 1930, is considered the birthday of the Gomselmash plant, when the foundry produced the first melt. The plant's reaching its design capacity and its successful operation in the 1930s allowed the USSR to completely abandon the import of dozens of types of machines for fodder production, grain farming, flax and hemp growing, primary processing of bast crops — now Gomselmash provided agricultural producers with such machines. In 1940, 18 out of 26 Gomselmash products were included in Soviet exports.

CEOs over the years

 1930-1933 Ya. Ya. Ambrazhunas
 1933-1943 A. K. Genkin
 1943-1944 V. T. Serikov
 1944-1946 T. I. Yakovlev
 1946-1955 A. Ya. Bykov
 1955-1956 A. A. Safronov
 1956-1960 F. N. Denisov
 1960-1972 I.P. Kitten
 1972-1987 N. I. Afanasiev
 1987-1992 S. S. Drozd
 1992-1995 S. I. Prokopenko
 1995-2012 Zhmaylik Valery Alekseevich
 2012-2019 Kamko Alexander Ivanovich
 Since 2019 Alexander Novikov

Awards

 Order of Lenin (1971)
 Order of the Red Banner of Labor (1980)
 Medal "In connection with the 30th anniversary of the Slovak People's Uprising and the May Uprising of the Czech People" (Czechoslovakia, 1975)
 Honorary Diplomas of the Parliament of the Republic of Belarus
 Prizes of the Government of the Republic of Belarus in the field of quality (2001, 2004, 2007, 2012)
 Prizes of the Ministry of Industry of the Republic of Belarus in the field of quality (2006, 2009, 2013)
 Diploma winner of the Commonwealth of Independent States Prize for achievements in the field of product and service quality (2009)
 Laureate of the CIS Prize for achievements in the field of quality (2013)

References

Gomel
Industry in Belarus
Companies of Belarus
Belarusian brands
Companies established in 1930
1930 establishments in Belarus
Agriculture companies of the Soviet Union
Buildings and structures built in the Soviet Union